The enzyme diaminopropionate ammonia-lyase (EC 4.3.1.15) catalyzes the chemical reaction

2,3-diaminopropanoate + H2O  pyruvate + 2 NH3

This enzyme belongs to the family of lyases, specifically ammonia lyases, which cleave carbon-nitrogen bonds.  The systematic name of this enzyme class is 2,3-diaminopropanoate ammonia-lyase (adding water; pyruvate-forming). Other names in common use include diaminopropionatase, α,β-diaminopropionate ammonia-lyase, 2,3-diaminopropionate ammonia-lyase, and 2,3-diaminopropanoate ammonia-lyase.  It employs one cofactor, pyridoxal phosphate.

References

 

EC 4.3.1
Pyridoxal phosphate enzymes
Enzymes of unknown structure